The Route Départementale 914 or RD 914 is the scenic route by the Mediterranean Sea, between Perpignan and Cerbère, at the Spanish border.
Formerly named Route Nationale 114, or  RN 114 before being handed to the département of Pyrénées-Orientales, on December 9 2005.
It becomes the Spanish National Road N-260 or Eix Pirenenc (in Catalan) as it crosses the border toward Portbou.

The N-260 is about to be upgraded into a highway, the "Autovía del Eje Pirenaico" (in Spanish) or "Autovia del Eix Pirenenc" (in Catalan), the Autovía A-26.

See the Route Départementale 914 on GoogleMaps

From Perpignan to Cerbère 

 Perpignan (km 0)
 Corneilla-del-Vercol
 Elne (km 13)
 Argelès-sur-Mer (km 21)
 Collioure (km 27)
 Port-Vendres (km 30)
 Paulilles (km 33)
 Banyuls-sur-Mer (km 36)
 Cerbère (km 45)
 Col des Balistres

See also 

 Côte Vermeille

914
Pyrénées-Orientales
Northern Catalonia
Transport in Occitania (administrative region)